Endocrine Connections is a society-owned, monthly, peer-reviewed, open access academic journal. It covers endocrinology with a focus on basic, clinical and translational research and reviews in all areas of endocrinology, including papers that deal with non-classical tissues as source or targets of hormones and endocrine papers that have relevance to endocrine-related and intersecting disciplines and the wider biomedical community. It is jointly owned by the European Society of Endocrinology and the Society for Endocrinology. The editor-in-chief is Professor Adrian Clark (Honorary Professor of Medicine, Barts and The London School of Medicine and Dentistry; Emeritus Professor of Endocrinology, St George’s University of London, UK), who succeeded Professor Josef Köhrle (Charité – Universitätsmedizin Berlin) in 2021. According to the Journal Citation Reports, the journal has a 2020 impact factor of 3.335. The journal has been published by Bioscientifica since 2012.

History 

Endocrine Connections was established in June 2012 as a joint venture between ESE and the Society for Endocrinology, to be published by Bioscientifica and to service the endocrine community as one of the first fully open-access endocrine journals.

The founding editor-in-chief was Dr Jens Sandahl Christiansen, Professor of Medicine at the University of Aarhus. Endocrine Connections key aim is to offer authors rapid, wide exposure for their work to the global scientific community as publishing open access enables critical research discoveries to be free to anyone and everyone.

The journal was accepted into PubMed Central in May 2013, highlighting a major milestone in the journals development.

The current Editor-in-Chief is Professor Josef Köhrle who stepped up from his role as Senior Editor in 2016. Josef Köhrle had been on the Editorial Board of the journal since its inception.

Endocrine Connections received its first Impact Factor of 2.541 in 2017 and in 2020 received its highest Impact Factor of 3.335

Online access 

All peer-reviewed editorial and review content is free to access from publication. As the journal is fully open-access, all published articles are released under the ‘gold’ open access option, whereby authors pay an article publishing charge upon acceptance to have their article made freely available online immediately upon publication. These articles are automatically deposited into PubMed Central.

Endocrine Connections licence policy includes CC BY, CC BY-NC and CC BY-NC-ND.

Abstracting and indexing 

Endocrine Connections is indexed in:

External links

References 

Publications established in 1948

English-language journals

Endocrinology journals
Monthly journals
Academic journals associated with international learned and professional societies of Europe
Bioscientifica academic journals